Bled es-Siba or Bled Siba (Arabic: بلاد السيبة), is a historical term in pre-colonial Moroccan history that refers to a lawless area that was out of the control of the Moroccan Sultans.

Name origin
Bled es-Siba literally means "region of anarchy" as opposed to Bled el-Makhzen which refers to the region under the control of the Makhzen governing institution.

Historical background 
Morocco has been ruled by the Alaouite dynasty since the 17th century. Many Berber tribes were however, not submissive to the Sultan. This led to two different regions: Bled es-Siba and Bled el-Makhzen.

Makhzen and Siba 
The relation between the central power of Makhzen and the region of Bled es-Siba was more complex than a simple territorial separation. Even though the tribes in Bled es-Siba were not submissive to the central power, the spiritual authority of the Sultan was always accepted.

References

External links 
 Amazigh: The Berbers of Morocco 
 Report on Workshop Outlining Literature on Moroccan Politics

20th century in Morocco
Geographic history of Morocco